The striped mud turtle (Kinosternon baurii) is a species of turtle in the family Kinosternidae. The species is native to the southeastern United States.

Etymology
The specific name, baurii, is in honor of herpetologist Georg Baur.

Geographic range
The striped mud turtle is found in Florida, Georgia, North Carolina, South Carolina, and Virginia.

Description
K. baurii has three light-colored stripes along the length of the smooth carapace. It can grow to a straight carapace length of 8–12 cm (3-4¾ inches).

Habitat and behavior
K. baurii is a common species found in freshwater habitats. It wanders about on land more than any other of the mud turtles and can sometimes be observed foraging for food in cow dung.

Diet
The striped mud turtle is omnivorous. It eats insects, snails, fish, carrion, algae, and plants. The striped mud turtle also eats dried up krill.

Captivity
As a pet K. baurii is easy to care for, readily eating commercial turtle foods, feeder fish, and worms.

Reproduction
Adult females of K. baurii nest from September to June. The eggs, which are slightly over 2.5 cm (1 in) long, hatch 13 to 19 weeks later. The hatchlings are about 2.5 cm (1 inch) in straight carapace length and, unlike the adult turtles, have keeled carapaces.

References

Bibliography

Further reading
Behler, John L.; King, F. Wayne (1979). The Audubon Society Field Guide to North American Reptiles and Amphibians. New York: Alfred A. Knopf. 743 pp. . (Kinosternon bauri, pp. 438–439 + Plate 317).
Garman S (1891). "On a Tortoise found in Florida and Cuba, Cinosternum Baurii ". Bulletin of the Essex Institute 23: 141–144. (Cinosternum baurii, new species).
Powell R, Conant R, Collins JT (2016). Peterson Field Guide to Reptiles and Amphibians of Eastern and Central North America, Fourth Edition. Boston and New York: Houghton Mifflin Harcourt. xiv + 494 pp. . (Kinosternon baurii, pp. 223–224 + Plate 19).
Smith, Hobart M; Brodie, Edmund D. Jr. (1982). Reptiles of North America: A Guide to Field Identification. New York: Golden Press. 240 pp.  (paperback);  (hardcover). (Kinosternon bauri, pp. 24–25).

Kinosternon
Endemic fauna of the United States
Reptiles of the United States
Reptiles described in 1891
Taxa named by Samuel Garman